Roar Ljøkelsøy (born 31 May 1976) is a Norwegian former ski jumper who competed from 1993 to 2010, and twice finished runner up in the World Cup.

Career

He won his first individual World Cup event on 25 January 2003 and was a very consistent competitor in the 2003/04 and 2004/05 seasons, finishing runner-up in both. In 2003–04 he won seven out of the last eleven competitions, finishing ten points short of eventual winner Janne Ahonen. 

In addition to winning eleven individual and three team World Cup events, Ljøkelsøy won the ski jumping event at the Holmenkollen Ski Festival in 2004. He then won the individual and team gold medal at the 2004 Ski Flying World Championships in Planica. 

At the 2005 Ski Jumping World Championships, Ljøkelsøy won a silver medal on the individual large hill and a bronze on the team large hill. In 2006, he retained his Ski Flying World Championship in Kulm, winning with over twenty points to the next competitor, despite feeling ill. The next day, he led the Norwegian team to victory in the team event, together with Ingebrigtsen, Romøren and Lars Bystøl. 

At the 2007 Ski Jumping World Championships in Sapporo, Ljøkelsøy won silver on the team large hill and bronze on the individual large hill.

Ljøkelsøy retired from the sport after competing in the 2010 Ski Flying World Championships in Planica, with his last official jump being 193.5 metres.

World Cup

Standings

Wins

References
 
Holmenkollen winners since 1892 - click Vinnere for downloadable pdf file 
 

1976 births
Holmenkollen Ski Festival winners
Living people
Norwegian male ski jumpers
Olympic bronze medalists for Norway
Olympic ski jumpers of Norway
Ski jumpers at the 1994 Winter Olympics
Ski jumpers at the 1998 Winter Olympics
Ski jumpers at the 2002 Winter Olympics
Ski jumpers at the 2006 Winter Olympics
Olympic medalists in ski jumping
FIS Nordic World Ski Championships medalists in ski jumping
Medalists at the 2006 Winter Olympics
Sportspeople from Trøndelag